"Si Veo a Tu Mamá" (English: "If I See Your Mother") is a song by Puerto Rican rapper Bad Bunny from his third studio album YHLQMDLG (2020). It was released on March 2, 2020, as the fourth single from the album. The song was solely written by Bunny with Subelo NEO and Elikai handling the production and it interpolates "The Girl from Ipanema", written by Antônio Carlos Jobim, Vinícius de Moraes and Norman Gimbel, performed by Stan Getz and João Gilberto.

Lyrics
"Si Veo a Tu Mamá" talks about a person who has not moved on yet from his former partner, no matter how much he pretends he is over her. The person is curious about his ex and is willing to ask their mother about it.

Promotion and release
On February 28, 2020, Bad Bunny announced his third studio album that was revealed to be YHLQMDLG during his performance and guest appearance on The Tonight Show Starring Jimmy Fallon, which was released the following day.

Commercial performance
Following the releasing of its parent album, "Si Veo a Tu Mamá" charted at number 32 on the US Billboard Hot 100 dated March 14, 2020, becoming the highest charting track from YHLQMDLG as well as peaking at number 1 on the US Hot Latin Songs chart upon the issue date of March 14, 2020, becoming the highest charting track. In Spain, "Si Veo a Tu Mamá" reached at number 10.

Audio visualizer
A visualizer video for the song was uploaded to YouTube on February 29, 2020, along with the other visualizer videos of the songs that appeared on YHLQMDLG.

Music video
A music video for "Si Veo a Tu Mamá" was released on March 2, 2020 on YouTube.

Charts

Weekly charts

Year-end charts

Certifications

See also
List of Billboard Hot Latin Songs and Latin Airplay number ones of 2020

References

External links
 
 

2020 songs
2020 singles
Bad Bunny songs
Songs written by Bad Bunny